Hazardia is a small genus of North American flowering plants in the family Asteraceae. Plants in this genus may be called bristleweeds or goldenbushes.

Hazardia is native to the western United States and northwestern Mexico, including offshore islands in the Pacific. The genus is especially common in California, and on the Baja California Peninsula in Mexico, with a few species extending into Oregon and Nevada. They are short, hardy perennials or small leafy shrubs. Some species have sharply toothed leaves. Generally they bear yellow flowers, with some having ray florets and appearing somewhat daisylike while others have only disc florets.

The genus was named after amateur botanist Barclay Hazard of Santa Barbara, 1852–1938.

 Species
 Hazardia berberidis - Baja California, Baja California Sur
 Hazardia brickellioides - brickellbush goldenweed - California, Nevada
 Hazardia cana - island hazardia, San Clemente Island hazardia - San Clemente Island, Guadalupe Island
 Hazardia detonsa - island bristleweed - Santa Cruz Island
 Hazardia ferrisiae - Baja California
 Hazardia orcuttii - Baja California, San Diego County
 Hazardia rosarica - Baja California
 Hazardia squarrosa - sawtooth goldenbush - southern California
 Hazardia stenolepis - serpentine bristleweed - California
 Hazardia vernicosa - Baja California
 Hazardia whitneyi - Whitney's bristleweed - California, Oregon

References

External links
 Jepson Manual Treatment
 United States Department of Agriculture - Plant Profile

 
Asteraceae genera
Flora of North America
Flora of Baja California
Flora of Baja California Sur
Flora of Mexican Pacific Islands